The 1974–75 Yugoslav First League season was the 29th season of the First Federal League of Yugoslavia (Croatian: Prva savezna liga, Serbian: Прва савезна лига, Slovenian: Prva zvezna liga), the top level association football competition of SFR Yugoslavia, since its establishment in 1946. A total of 18 teams competed in the league, with the previous season's champions Hajduk Split successfully defending their title, finishing the season three points clear of runners-up Vojvodina.

The season began on 17 August 1974 and concluded on 29 June 1975. This was the second national title win for Hajduk under the guidance of manager Tomislav Ivić, who previously led the club to three consecutive Yugoslav Cup wins in 1972, 1973 and 1974. In the following seasons Ivić won the 1976 cup and the 1978–79 championship with Hajduk, becoming the most successful manager in club's history.

Strikers Boško Đorđević of Partizan and Dušan Savić of Red Star shared the title of top goalscorer with 20 goals each. Both players topped the scoring table for the first time in their careers, with Savić repeating the achievement in the 1978–79 season.

Teams
A total of eighteen teams contested the league, including sixteen sides from the 1973–74 season and two sides promoted from the 1973–74 Yugoslav Second League (YSL) as winners of the two second level divisions East and West. The league was contested in a double round robin format, with each club playing every other club twice, for a total of 34 rounds. Two points were awarded for wins and one point for draws.

FK Borac Banja Luka and NK Zagreb were relegated from the 1973–74 Yugoslav First League after finishing the season in bottom two places of the league table. Borac had completed a four-year stay at the highest level of Yugoslav football, while NK Zagreb had to return to second level after only one year in top flight.

The two clubs promoted to top level were FK Radnički Kragujevac and NK Rijeka. Radnički Kragujevac returned to the highest division as winners of YSL Division East after spending two years in second level, which had ended their previous 1969–1972 three-season spell. In comparison, Croatian side NK Rijeka returned as winners of YSL Division West after four years in second level, which had interrupted their earlier 1958–1969 eleven-year top level tenure. NK Rijeka would go on to remain in top flight until the 1990–91 season, when Croatian and Slovenian clubs abandoned the Yugoslav league amid the breakup of Yugoslavia.

League table

Results

Winning squad

Top scorers

Attendance

Overall league attendance per match: 10,859 spectators

See also
1974–75 Yugoslav Second League
1974 Yugoslav Cup
1974–75 NK Dinamo Zagreb season
1974–75 NK Hajduk Split season

References

External links
Yugoslavia Domestic Football Full Tables

Yugoslav First League seasons
Yugo
1974–75 in Yugoslav football